Edward Obewa (born 15 May 1962) is a Ugandan boxer. He competed in the men's bantamweight event at the 1988 Summer Olympics. At the 1988 Summer Olympics, he lost to Vedat Tutuk of Turkey.

References

1962 births
Living people
Ugandan male boxers
Olympic boxers of Uganda
Boxers at the 1988 Summer Olympics
Place of birth missing (living people)
Bantamweight boxers